The 1999 Nunavut general election was the first general election in the territory and was held on 15 February 1999, to elect the members of the 1st Legislative Assembly of Nunavut.

Although Nunavut did not become a territory until 1 April 1999 the election was held early to enable the members to assume their duties on that date.

The territory operates on a consensus government system with no political parties; the premier is subsequently chosen by and from the MLAs.

Paul Okalik was chosen to be Premier of Nunavut.

Elected

See also
 1st Legislative Assembly of Nunavut

References

1999
Nunavut general
1999 in Nunavut
February 1999 events in Canada